Yoon Min-soo (born February 27, 1980) is a South Korean singer and television personality. He and Ryu Jae-hyn comprise the K-pop/contemporary R&B duo Vibe. He was a former cast member of the variety show Dad! Where Are We Going?.

Discography

Singles

Other charted songs

Filmography

Television shows

References

Living people
South Korean contemporary R&B singers
South Korean television personalities
Singers from Seoul
1980 births
21st-century South Korean male  singers